In Tibetan Buddhism and Bon, a ngagpa (male), or a ngagmo (female) (Sanskrit mantrī) is an ordained non-monastic practitioner of Dzogchen and Tantra. Traditionally, many Nyingma ngakpas wear uncut hair and white robes and these are sometimes called "the white-robed and uncut-hair group" (Wylie: gos dkar lcang lo'i sde).

In Bhutan, and some other parts of the Himalayas, the term gomchen is the term most often used to refer to this type of Vajrayana priest.

Description and definitions
Matthieu Ricard defines ngakpa simply as "a practitioner of the Secret Mantrayana". Gyurme Dorje defines ngakpa (mantrin) as "a practitioner of the mantras, who may live as a householder rather than a renunciate monk."

Tibetan Buddhism contains two systems of ordination, the familiar monastic ordinations and the less well known ngagpa or Tantric ordinations. Ngagpa ordination is non-monastic and non-celibate. It entails its own extensive system of vows, distinct from the monastic vows.

Ngakpas often marry and have children. Some work in the world, though they are required to devote significant time to retreat and practice and in enacting rituals when requested by, or on behalf of, members of the community.

There are family lineages of ngakpas, with the practice of a particular Yidam being passed through family lineages. However, a ngakpa may also be deemed as anyone thoroughly immersed and engaged in the practice of the teachings and under the guidance of a lineage-holder and who has taken the appropriate vows or samaya and had the associated empowerments and transmissions. Significant lineage transmission is through oral lore.

As scholar Sam van Schaik describes, "the lay tantric practitioner (sngags pa, Skt. māntrin) became a common figure in Tibet, and would remain so throughout the history of Tibetan Buddhism."

Kunga Gyaltsen, the father of the 2nd Dalai Lama, was a non-monastic ngakpa, a famous Nyingma tantric master. His mother was Machik Kunga Pemo; they were a farming family. Their lineage transmission was by birth.

History

Ngagpa college of Labrang Monastery
Labrang Monastery, one of the major Gelug monasteries in Amdo, has a ngagpa college located nearby the main monastery at Sakar village.

See also

Aro gTér
:Category:Ngagpa

References

Notes

Citations

Works cited

Further reading

External links
Vajranatha on defense of ngakpas by Nubchen Sangye Yeshe
Introduction to the White Sangha of Ngakpa and Ngakmo

 
Tibetan Buddhist titles
Bon
Dzogchen
Buddhist religious occupations
Tibetan words and phrases